Saibal Chattopadhyay is an Indian academic and management professor. He was the Director of Indian Institute of Management Calcutta from 2013 to 2018.

Chattopadhyay is a Professor in the Operations Management group at IIM Calcutta, and is a former Dean of the business school. In the past, he has been associated with Presidency College of the University of Calcutta, University of Connecticut and University of Nebraska–Lincoln.

References

External links
Indian Institute of Management Calcutta Faculty Information
Indian Institute of Management Calcutta

Academic staff of the Indian Institute of Management Calcutta
Living people
University of Calcutta alumni
Academic staff of the University of Calcutta
Year of birth missing (living people)